Anti Video Piracy Association of Singapore (AVPAS) is a copy protection consortium with other anime producers founded by Odex on 30 July 2003. The association lists over 400 titles (as of 25 May 2007) and is supported by at least one governmental agency. AVPAS is not a governmental agency by itself. It aims to monitor and combat the unauthorized distribution of video related rights, in particular anime and Japanese-related Intellectual Property. The website technically is being maintained by NetroAsia. Its main committee members are Dr. Toh See Kiat (AVPAS president), Go Wei Ho Peter (AVPAS vice president and Odex director), Sing Xin Yang (AVPAS secretary and Odex director) and Yong Yet Yuen (AVPAS Secretary).

The organisation, along with Odex, gained considerable prominence in mid-2007 due to Odex's legal actions against Internet users in Singapore, which were ultimately rejected by the Court in January 2008.

Efforts in tackling video infringement in Singapore
Up to date, the AVPAS has only been known to have created a website which features the Odex Clarification Article on their homepage, has pictures of bootlegged anime and Japanese video CDs and contains a list of authorised titles.

According to the "Odex Clarification Article" on the AVPAS website, the AVPAS has also been said to have authorised Odex to carry out demands of money from anime downloaders.

Controversy
The title "AVPAS" may mislead people into believing that AVPAS is a government organization or an organization registered with the Registry of Societies (ROS). The AVPAS is also not a commercial entity by itself (not registered with ACRA) but is registered by NETROASIA PTE LTD, the "technical admin" for ODEX.

Netizens virtually unanimously agree that they did not even know about the existence of AVPAS before the Odex Saga.

The domain name for the AVPAS website was registered in April 2007, three months before Odex started the saga in July to September 2007.

About its sudden prominence in mid-2007, which coincided with Odex's rise to notoriety among Netizens, there have been concerns raised regarding the legitimacy and purpose of AVPAS, especially since its main committee is dominated by the Odex directors. The AVPAS website appears to have ceased from being updated since 31 August 2007, which is coincidentally the beginning of the period when the Odex Saga started to blow over in mainstream media.

Despite being self-dubbed the Anti Video Piracy Association of Singapore, the AVPAS does not seem to be interested in monitoring or combating the copyright violation of non-anime or non-Japanese films as the only titles listed or displayed on its website are either anime or Japanese video titles. No publicly known action has been taken by the AVPAS against file sharers dabbling in non-anime and non-Japanese videos.

References

External links
Official website

Copyright law organizations
2003 establishments in Singapore
Organizations established in 2003
Business organisations based in Singapore